The 2017 Coupe Banque Nationale was a tennis tournament played on indoor carpet courts. It was the 25th edition of the Tournoi de Québec and part of the WTA International tournaments of the 2017 WTA Tour. It took place at the PEPS de l'Université Laval in Quebec City, Canada, from September 11 through September 17, 2017.

Points and prize money

Point distribution

Prize money

Singles main draw entrants

Seeds

1 Rankings are as of August 28, 2017

Other entrants
The following players received wildcards into the singles main draw:
  Destanee Aiava
  Aleksandra Wozniak
  Carol Zhao

The following players entered the singles main draw with a protected ranking:
  Jessica Pegula
  Anna Tatishvili

The following players received entry from the qualifying draw:
  Gabriela Dabrowski
  Caroline Dolehide 
  Andrea Hlaváčková 
  Alla Kudryavtseva
  Charlotte Robillard-Millette
  Fanny Stollár

Withdrawals
Before the tournament
  Ana Bogdan →replaced by  Sofia Kenin
  Julia Boserup →replaced by  Jamie Loeb
  Eugenie Bouchard →replaced by  Marina Erakovic
  Kayla Day →replaced by  Lucie Hradecká
  Camila Giorgi →replaced by  Grace Min
  Patricia Maria Țig →replaced by  Sachia Vickery
  Heather Watson →replaced by  Asia Muhammad

Retirements
 Océane Dodin (dizziness)

Doubles main draw entrants

Seeds

1 Rankings are as of August 28, 2017

Other entrants
The following pairs received wildcards into the doubles main draw:
 Bianca Andreescu /  Carson Branstine 
 Jessica Pegula /  Charlotte Robillard-Millette

The following pair received entry as alternates:
 Usue Maitane Arconada /  Caroline Dolehide

Withdrawals
Before the tournament
 Jessica Pegula

Retirements
 Xenia Knoll (left hand injury)

Champions

Singles

  Alison Van Uytvanck def.  Tímea Babos, 5–7, 6–4, 6–1

Doubles

 Tímea Babos /   Andrea Hlaváčková def.  Bianca Andreescu /  Carson Branstine, 6–3, 6–1

References

External links
Official website

Coupe Banque Nationale
Tournoi de Québec
Coupe Banque Nationale
Coupe Banque Nationale
2010s in Quebec City